This is a list of Twelve Steps alternate wordings of the Twelve Steps set of guiding principles for recovery from addictive, compulsive, or other behavioral problems that was originally developed by Alcoholics Anonymous. The twelve-step method has been adapted widely by fellowships of people recovering from various addictions, compulsive behaviors, and mental health problems.  Albert Lachance has even adapted it to dealing with "consumer addictions" such as shopping therapy.

In some cases, where other twelve-step groups have adapted the AA steps as guiding principles, they have been altered to emphasize principles important to those particular fellowships, to remove gender-biased or specific religious language.

Gamblers Anonymous has made significant changes to Steps 2, 3, 4, 5, 6, 7 and 12 by reducing references to God, including a financial inventory, and eliminating "Spiritual Awakening".

Most of the alternate wordings are in Step 1 and Step 12:

See also
Twelve-step program
List of twelve-step groups

References

Twelve Step alternate wordings